Jaffna Municipal Council (JMC) is the local authority for the city of Jaffna in northern Sri Lanka. JMC is responsible for providing a variety of local public services including roads, sanitation, drains, housing, libraries, public parks and recreational facilities. Established in January 1949 as a successor to Jaffna Urban Council, it currently has 45 members elected using the mixed electoral system.

History
The first organised local government for the city of Jaffna was the sanitary board established under the Sanitary Boards Ordinance No. 18 of 1892. The board consisted of the local Government Agent (chair) and other local officials from the British administration. A local board was established in July 1906 under the Local Boards Ordinance No. 13 of 1898. The board consisted of six members, three official (including the Government Agent who was chair) and three unofficial representing three wards - central, eastern and western. The local board was responsible for establishing the grand bazaar, small bazaar in Gurunagar and the rest house.

A ten member urban district council (UDC) was established in January 1923 under the Local Government Ordinance No. 11 of 1920. Two of its members were nominated and eight were elected, representing eight wards. The UDC had an area of 8½ square miles and a population of 42,346. The UDC, which was based in a small office at Jaffna Kachcheri, required new premises and the Ridgeway Memorial Hall on the esplanade was identified as a suitable location. Ridgeway Memorial Hall was demolished and new premises, whose foundations were laid by chairman R. R. Nalliah, constructed. The building was formally opened by Governor Reginald Edward Stubbs on 9 June 1936. Subsequently a town hall was built on the site and officially opened by Waithilingam Duraiswamy, Speaker of the State Council.

A twelve member Jaffna Urban Council was established in January 1940 under the Urban Councils Ordinance No. 61 of 1939. Two of its members were nominated and ten were elected. The urban council had the same powers and functions as the UDC but franchise was extended to include women. A fifteen member Jaffna Municipal Council was established in January 1949 under the Municipal Council Ordinance No. 29 of 1947. The fifteen members were elected from fifteen wards. A lack of storage space resulted in the municipal council purchasing premises east of Front Street in 1955. The number of members and wards was increased to 23 in 1968. Mayor of Jaffna Alfred Duraiappah was assassinated by the militant Liberation Tigers of Tamil Eelam (LTTE) on 27 July 1975.

On 10 April 1985 the LTTE attacked Jaffna police station, located next to the town hall, causing serious damage to the town hall. Numerous other municipal council facilities including the library, rest house, open air theatre and grand bazaar were damaged beyond repair during the civil war. As a result of the damage caused to the town hall the municipal council was forced to re-locate to premises on Point Pedro Road on land leased from Nallur Kandaswamy temple.

The Local Authorities (Amendment) Act Nos. 20 and 24 of 1987 changed the method of electing all local authority members from the first past the post using wards to proportional representation using open lists. Mayors Sarojini Yogeswaran and Pon Sivapalan were assassinated by the LTTE on 17 May 1998 and 11 September 1998 respectively.

On 10 October 2012 Parliament passed the Local Authorities (Special Provisions) Act, No. 21 of 2012 and Local Authorities Elections (Amendment) Act, No. 22 of 2012, changing the electoral system for electing local authority members from open list proportional representation to a mixed electoral system whereby 70% of members would be elected using first past the post voting and the remaining 30% through closed list proportional representation. On 25 August 2017 Parliament passed Local Authorities Elections (Amendment) Act, No. 16 of 2017 which, amongst things, changed the ratio between first past the post and proportional representation from 70:30 to 60:40.

Wards
JMC currently has 27 single member wards.

Mayors

The current Mayor of Jaffna is V. Manivannan of the Tamil National People's Front.

Election results

1983 local government election
Results of the local government election held on 18 May 1983:

The Sri Lankan government suspended all local government in the north and east of the country in 1983 using emergency regulations. The civil war prevented elections from being held for JMC until 1998.

In March 1994 elections were held in the east and in Vavuniya in the north. However, elections weren't held in other areas of the north, including the Jaffna peninsula, because most of these areas were at that time controlled by the rebel LTTE. In August 1995 the Sri Lankan military launched an offensive to recapture the Jaffna peninsula. By December 1995 the military had captured most of the Valikamam region of the peninsula, including the city of Jaffna. By 16 May 1996 the military had recaptured the entire peninsula. In late 1996 the government announced elections would be held for 23 local authorities in Jaffna District, Kilinochchi District, Mannar District and Vavuniya District but following opposition from Tamil political parties postponed them. On 3 December 1997 the government announced that elections would be held for the 17 local authorities on the Jaffna peninsula. The Tamil political parties were still opposed to holding elections as "normalcy" hadn't returned to the peninsula. The peninsula was under the firm grip of the Sri Lankan military and civil government had little, if any, role in the administration of the peninsula. The Tamil Tigers were also firmly against the elections being held. Despite these objections the elections were held on 29 January 1998.

1998 local government election
Results of the local government election held on 29 January 1998:

On 1 January 2002 local authority elections were called for the entire country. It was later announced that elections would be held on 25 March 2002 in the north and east, and on 20 March 2002 in the rest of the country. The normal life term of Sri Lankan local government bodies is four years. The life term of JMC expired in February 2002 but the central government extended this by another year, as the law allows. On 21 March 2002 the Election Commissioner announced that the elections in the north and east, except for eight local authorities in Ampara District, had been postponed until 25 September 2002. On 17 September 2002 elections in the north and east were postponed, for a second time, until 25 June 2003. Elections should have been held when the extension expired in February 2003 but in January 2003, following a request from the Tamil National Alliance, the central government instead dissolved JMC using emergency powers and instead put in place special commissioners to administer the local area. In June 2003 elections in the north and east were postponed, for a third time, until 24 January 2004. In January 2004 elections in the north and east, except for local authorities in Ampara District, were postponed, for a fourth time, until 23 October 2004.

On 27 January 2006 local authority elections were called for the entire country. It was later announced that elections would be held on 30 March 2006 across the entire country. The Election Commissioner subsequently postponed the elections in the north and Batticaloa District until 30 September 2006. On 23 September 2006 elections in the north and Batticaloa District were postponed until 30 June 2007.

JMC continued to be administered by special commissioners until the 2009 elections.

2009 local government election
Results of the local government election held on 8 August 2009:

The following candidates were elected: Mudiyappu Remediyas (TNA), 4,223 preference votes (pv); Thurairajah Illango alias Regan (UPFA-EPDP), 3,387 pv; Mohamed Sultan Moulavi Sufian (Ind 1), 1,779 pv; Anthonypillai Mariamma (TNA), 1,678 pv; Murugiah Komahan (UPFA-EPDP), 1,573 pv; Vinthan Kanagaratnam (TNA), 1,442 pv; Manuel Mangaleswaran alias Nesapriyan (UPFA-EPDP), 1,394 pv; Meerasahib Mohamed Rameez (UPFA-ACMC), 1,338 pv; Yogeswari Patkunarajah (UPFA-EPDP), 1,250 pv; Pilevian Expedith Cracian (UPFA-EPDP), 1,166 pv; Nadarajah Rajathevan (TNA), 1,118 pv; Benjamin Jacob (TNA), 1,039 pv; Mohamed Merasahib Mustafa (UPFA-ACMC), 1,029 pv; Manikkam Kanagaraththinam (UPFA-EPDP), 1,025 pv; A. Paranjothy (TNA), 1,007 pv; Sutharsingh Vijiyakanth (UPFA-EPDP), 989 pv; Asker Roomi Badurtheen (UPFA-ACMC), 979 pv; Ajmaeen Asfar (UPFA-ACMC), 960 pv; Suvikaran Nishanthan (UPFA-EPDP), 896 pv; Anthonipillai Cilapotasious (UPFA-EPDP), 889 pv; Mariyakorattry Anton (TNA), 881 pv; Arulappu Korneliyas (TNA), 826 pv; and V. Anandasangaree (TULF) 424 pv.
  
Yogeswari Patkunarajah (UPFA-EPDP) and Thurairajah Illango (UPFA-EPDP) were appointed Mayor and Deputy Mayor respectively. Mudiyappu Remediyas of the TNA was appointed as the Opposition Leader of the Council but he crossed over to the UPFA in June 2011.

Suvikaran Nishanthan (UPFA-EPDP) ceased to be member of JMC in January 2012 after ceasing to be a member of the UPFA. He was replaced by Selvarasah Iramanan (UPFA). Thurairajah Illango (UPFA-EPDP) resigned from being Deputy Mayor and was replaced by Meerasahib Mohamed Rameez (UPFA-ACMC).

2018 local government election
Results of the local government election held on 8 February 2018:

Results by ward:

The following candidates were elected: Jesurajah Mary Anjala (TNA-Gurunagar), Paramalingam Anushiya (EPDP-PR), E. Arnold (TNA-ITAK-Passaiyoor), Mahalingam Arulkumaran (TNA-Grand Bazaar), Necolas Mariyathas Balachandran (TNA-Navanthurai North), Flavian Expedith Crasian (TNA-Reclamation West), Solomon Cyril (TNA-Chundikuli Maruthady), Crasian Damian (EPDP-PR), Thurairajah Eesan (TNA-TELO-Columbuthurai), Thurairasa Ilango (EPDP-PR), Likori Clement Jeyaseelan (TNPF-Cathedral), Rajaratnam Kanesarajah (TNPF-Vannarpannai North), Vaithilingam Kirubakaran (TNPF-Ariyalai West), Karthikesu Velum Mayilum Kugenthiran (EPDP-PR), Sinnathurai Kulenthirarajah (UNF-PR), Nadarajah Logathayalan (TNA-PR), Vishvalingam Manivannan (TNPF-PR), Mahenthiran Mayooran (TNPF-Attiaddy), Jeyanthini Nageswaran (EPDP-PR), Muththu Muhammathu Muhammathu Nibahir (TNA-New Moor Street), Kathiravel Niththiyananthan (TNA-Jaffna Town), Kachcha Mohamed Mahamed Niyas (UNF-Old Moor Street), Subajini Antony Panadsha (TNPF-PR), Varatharajan Partheepan (TNPF-Kantharmadam South), Balasubramaniam Pathmamurali (TNPF-Ariyalai), Yogeswari Patkunarajah (EPDP-PR), Neekilapillai Philiph (EPDP-Navanthurai South), Nalina Premlal (TNA-PR), Jeyakkumar Rajeevkanth (TNPF-Kalaigakal), Ramalingam Rakini (TNA-Nallur Irajathani), Mudiyappu Remidius (EPDP-PR), Sebamalaimuththu Sathiyasekaran (EPDP-Reclamation East), Ramasamy Chettiyar Selvavadivel (EPDP-PR), Balasingam Shantharuban (SLFP-PR), Nagarasa Srikaran (SLFP-PR), Suganthini Srikaran (TNPF-PR), Subramaniyam Subatheesh (TNA-Kantharmadam North East), Ajantha Thanbalasingam (TNPF-PR), Nagalingam Thanenthiran (TNA-Koddady Fort), Sivakanthan Thanujan (TNPF-Iyanar Kovilady), Paramalingam Tharshananth (TNA-Kantharmadam North West), Mathivathani Vivekanantharasa (TNA-Sangiliyan Thoppu), Sutharsing Vijayakanth (TULF/EPRLF-Thirunagar), Vicneswaralingam Vijayathadshani (UNF-PR) and Ratnasingam Yenan (TNPF-Eachchamoddai).

E. Arnold (TNA) and Thurairajah Eesan (TNA) were elected Mayor and Deputy Mayor respectively when the council met for the first time in 26 March 2018.

References

External links
 

 
1949 establishments in Ceylon
Local authorities in Northern Province, Sri Lanka
Municipal councils of Sri Lanka